e Speu is a province of Cambodia. It borders the provinces of Pursat and Kampong Chhnang to the north, Kandal to the east, Takéo to the southeast, Kampot to the south and Koh Kong to the west. Its capital is the town of Chbar Mon.

Etymology
Kampong Speu in Khmer means "starfruit port" or "starfruit harbor". In Khmer, kampong is a place-name element, meaning "port" or "harbor". It derives from the Austronesian language, Malay, in which it means "village". Speu in the Khmer language means "starfruit".

Administrative divisions
The province is subdivided into 7 districts and 1 municipality, further divided into 87 communes.

Economy 
The Wing Star Shoes factory in Kampong Speu province manufactures Asics sports shoes. It collapsed in 2013. Three people were killed. Workers struck at the Wing Star Shoes Factory in 2014, blocking National Route 3, and demanding a $5 raise in bonuses and enforcement of labor laws. In 2016 and 2018, mass faintings of workers were reported. The cause in 2016, initially attributed to a worker having been possessed by a "spirit," was later revised to "poor health and imagination." 2018, police reported that after a worker had a seizure, her "scream caused a mass panic, prompting workers to run, feel dizzy and faint."

Attraction

Phnom Aural 

Phnom Aural is the tallest peak in Cambodia. It is 1,813 meters tall (other sources give elevations between 1,771 and 1,667 meters). It is in the eastern part of the Cardamom Mountains. To protect the biodiversity of the mountains, Phnom Aural Wildlife Sanctuary was established.
This mountain located in Aoral District, Kampong Speu province.

Oudong
Located at the foothill of the mountain Phnom Oudong, about 40 km northwest of the modern capital Phnom Penh, Oudong was royal residence and Cambodia's capital for more than 250 years until 1866. A monumental royal necropolis of sovereigns of several centuries is scattered on top the prominent bisected mountain, which runs from the southeast to the northeast.

Kirirom National Park

References

External links
Kirirom National Park, Cambodia

 
Provinces of Cambodia